Controlled (or closed) ecological life-support systems (acronym CELSS) are a self-supporting life support system for space stations and colonies typically through controlled closed ecological systems, such as the BioHome, BIOS-3, Biosphere 2, Mars Desert Research Station, and Yuegong-1.

Original concept
CELSS was first pioneered by the Soviet Union during the famed "Space Race" in the 1950s–60s. Originated by Konstantin Tsiolkovsky and furthered by V.I. Vernadsky, the first forays into this science were the use of closed, unmanned ecosystems, expanding into the research facility known as the BIOS-3.

Then in 1965, manned experiments began in the BIOS-3.

Rationale
Human presence in space, thus far, has been limited to our own Earth–Moon system. Also, everything that astronauts would need in the way of life support (air, water, and food) has been brought with them. This may be economical for short missions of spacecraft, but it is not the most viable solution when dealing with the life support systems of a long-term craft (such as a generation ship) or a settlement.

The aim of CELSS is to create a regenerative environment that can support and maintain human life via agricultural means.

Components of CELSS

Air revitalization
In non-CELSS environments, air replenishment and  processing typically consists of stored air tanks and  scrubbers. The drawback to this method lies in the fact that upon depletion the tanks would have to be refilled; the scrubbers would also require replacement after they become ineffective.

There is also the issue of processing toxic fumes, which come from the synthetic materials used in the construction of habitats. Therefore, the issue of how air quality is maintained requires attention; in experiments, it was found that the plants also removed volatile organic compounds offgassed by synthetic materials used thus far to build and maintain all man-made habitats.

In CELSS, air is initially supplied by external supply, but is maintained by the use of foliage plants, which create oxygen in photosynthesis (aided by the waste-byproduct of human respiration). Eventually, the main goal of a CELSS environment is to have foliage plants take over the complete and total production of oxygen needs; this would make the system a closed, instead of controlled, system.

Food / consumables production
As with all present forays into space, crews have had to store all consumables they require prior to launch. Typically, hard-food consumables were freeze dried so that the craft's weight could be reduced.

Of course, in a self-sustaining ecosystem, a place for crops to grow would be set aside, allowing foods to be grown and cultivated. The larger the group of people, the more crops would have to be grown.

As for water, experiments have shown that it would be derived from condensate in the air (a byproduct of air conditioning and vapors), as well as excess moisture from plants. It would then have to be filtered by some means, either by nature or by machine.

Waste-water treatment
Early space-flight had travelers either ejecting their wastes into space or storing it for a return trip.

CELSS studied means of breaking down human wastes and, if possible, integrating the processed products back into the ecology. For instance, urine was processed into water, which was safe for use in toilets and watering plants.

Wastewater treatment makes use of plants, particularly aquatic, to process the wastewater. It has been shown that the more waste is treated by the aquatic plants (or, more specifically, their root systems), the larger the aquatic plants grow.

In tests, such as those done in the BioHome, the plants also made viable compost as a growth medium for crops.

Closed versus controlled
Closed systems are totally self-reliant, recycling everything indefinitely with no external interaction. The life of such a system is limited, as the entropy of a closed system can only increase with time. But if the otherwise closed system is allowed to accept high-temperature radiant energy from an external source (e.g., sunlight) and to reject low-temperature waste heat to deep space, it can continue indefinitely. An example of such a system is the Earth itself.

Controlled systems, by contrast, depend on certain external interactions such as periodic maintenance. An example of such a system is the ISS.

Notable CELSS projects

 BioHome
 Biosphere 2
 BIOS-3
 Biosphere J
 Controlled Environment Systems Research Facility
 Biotron (disambiguation)
 Biotron Experimental Climate Change Research Facility

Other types of regenerative ecological systems
Bioregenerative life support system (acronym: BLSS)
Environmental Control and Life Support System (acronym ECLSS)
Engineered Closed/Controlled EcoSystem (acronym ECCES)
Spome

See also
 Life support system
 Closed ecological system
 Arcology

References

 
 
 
 
 

 
Ecological experiments
Systems ecology
Spacecraft life support systems